Henry Banister (c. 1538–1628) was an English politician who sat in the House of Commons in 1614 and in 1625.

Banister was a goldsmith living in Clapton, Hackney. In 1614, he was elected Member of Parliament for Preston in the Addled Parliament.  He was an out-burgess of Preston in 1624. In 1625 he was elected MP for Preston again.

Banister died at the age of about 90.

Banister had a son Christopher and two daughters.

His widow Anne (d. 1634) married Sir William Bulstrode in 1629, Member of Parliament for Rutland.

References

1538 births
1628 deaths
People from the London Borough of Hackney
English MPs 1614
English MPs 1625